Darana may refer to:
 Darana, Jolfa
 Darana, Khoda Afarin